Astatheros macracanthus, the blackthroat cichlid, is a species of cichlid freshwater fish from southern Mexico and northern Central America. It is the only recognized species in the genus Astatheros, but it was originally described in Heros, then for a long period included in Cichlasoma and until 2008 it was typically included in Amphilophus. Several other species have also been placed in Astatheros in the past, but they are now generally placed in Cribroheros.

References

External links
 

Heroini
Cichlid genera
Cichlid fish of Central America
Freshwater fish of Mexico
Taxa named by Jacques Pellegrin
Monotypic ray-finned fish genera